Green Brook Township is a township in Somerset County, in the U.S. state of New Jersey. It is centrally located within the Raritan Valley region. As of the 2020 United States census, the township's population was 7,281, an increase of 78 (+1.1%) from the 2010 census count of 7,203, which in turn reflected an increase of 1,549 (+27.4%) from the 5,654 counted in the 2000 census.

What is now Green Brook was originally created as North Plainfield Township on April 2, 1872, from portions of Warren Township. Portions of the township were taken to form North Plainfield borough (June 9, 1885) and Watchung (March 23, 1926). Green Brook was incorporated as a township by an act of the New Jersey Legislature on November 8, 1932, replacing North Plainfield Township, based on the results of a referendum held that same day.

Most of Green Brook shares ZIP Code 08812 with Dunellen.

The township describes itself as "Small Enough to Know You, Large Enough to Get Things Done".

History 
In 1872, a tract of land was subdivided off from Warren Township. Thirteen years later, in 1885, the Borough of North Plainfield was created from a section of the subdivided land. The land at that time was designated as North Plainfield. In 1926, the Borough of Watchung was carved out of North Plainfield Township. The municipality's name was changed to Green Brook Township in 1932.

It then continues southwestward and flows into the Raritan River at Bound Brook, which provides access to the New York City area and the Atlantic Ocean. The brook was named for the color of its water.

Also contained within the township is Washington Rock State Park, which commemorates the spot where George Washington and Marquis de Lafayette watched the movement of the British soldiers during the American Revolutionary War, mainly the months of May and June 1777.

Geography
According to the United States Census Bureau, the township had a total area of 4.42 square miles (11.43 km2), including 4.41 square miles (11.42 km2) of land and 0.01 square miles (0.02 km2) of water (0.18%).

The township is in the Raritan Valley, a line of places in central New Jersey. Green Brook lies in the northern division of Raritan Valley along with the borough of North Plainfield.

Unincorporated communities, localities and place names located partially or completely within the township include Seeley Mills and Washington Rock.

The township borders the municipalities of Bridgewater Township, North Plainfield, Warren Township and Watchung in Somerset County; Middlesex borough and  Dunellen in Middlesex County; and Plainfield in Union County.

Demographics

2010 census

The Census Bureau's 2006–2010 American Community Survey showed that (in 2010 inflation-adjusted dollars) median household income was $115,268 (with a margin of error of +/− $15,162) and the median family income was $123,796 (+/− $10,668). Males had a median income of $74,231 (+/− $16,708) versus $75,703 (+/− $8,965) for females. The per capita income for the borough was $49,068 (+/− $5,197). About 0.9% of families and 1.3% of the population were below the poverty line, including 1.8% of those under age 18 and 1.7% of those age 65 or over.

2000 census
As of the 2000 United States census there were 5,654 people, 1,893 households, and 1,508 families residing in the township.  The population density was 1,234.7 people per square mile (476.6/km2).  There were 1,916 housing units at an average density of 418.4 per square mile (161.5/km2).  The racial makeup of the township was 88.43% White, 1.68% African American, 0.07% Native American, 7.99% Asian, 0.04% Pacific Islander, 0.71% from other races, and 1.08% from two or more races. Hispanic or Latino of any race were 4.09% of the population.

There were 1,893 households, out of which 37.0% had children under the age of 18 living with them, 69.0% were married couples living together, 7.9% had a female householder with no husband present, and 20.3% were non-families. 15.9% of all households were made up of individuals, and 6.2% had someone living alone who was 65 years of age or older.  The average household size was 2.84 and the average family size was 3.20.

In the township the population was spread out, with 24.3% under the age of 18, 4.8% from 18 to 24, 30.5% from 25 to 44, 24.8% from 45 to 64, and 15.6% who were 65 years of age or older. The median age was 40 years. For every 100 females, there were 91.7 males.  For every 100 females age 18 and over, there were 89.0 males.

The median income for a household in the township was $80,644, and the median income for a family was $87,744. Males had a median income of $52,147 versus $46,434 for females. The per capita income for the township was $37,290. About 1.7% of families and 2.4% of the population were below the poverty line, including 0.9% of those under age 18 and 5.5% of those age 65 or over.

Government

Local government 
Green Brook Township is governed under the Township form of New Jersey municipal government, one of 141 municipalities (of the 564) statewide that use this form, the second-most commonly used form of government in the state. The Township Committee is comprised of five members, who are elected directly by the voters at-large in partisan elections to serve three-year terms of office on a staggered basis, with either one or two seats coming up for election each year as part of the November general election in a three-year cycle. At a reorganization meeting, held each year within the first week of January, the Committee elects a Mayor and a Deputy Mayor for that year from among its members.

, members of the Green Brook Township Committee are Mayor James Van Arsdale (R, term on committee ends December 31, 2024; term as mayor ends 2023), Deputy Mayor James Benscoter (R, term on committee ends and as deputy mayor ends 2023), Brian Conway (R, 2023), Gerard "Jerry" Searfoss (R, 2025) and Nancy Stoll (R, 2024).

Federal, state and county representation 
Green Brook Township is located in the 7th Congressional District and is part of New Jersey's 22nd state legislative district.

 

Somerset County is governed by a five-member Board of County Commissioners, whose members are elected at-large to three-year terms of office on a staggered basis, with one or two seats coming up for election each year. At an annual reorganization meeting held on the first Friday of January, the board selects a Director and Deputy Director from among its members. , Somerset County's County Commissioners are
Director Shanel Robinson (D, Franklin Township, term as commissioner ends December 31, 2024; term as director ends 2022),
Deputy Director Melonie Marano (D, Green Brook Township, term as commissioner and as deputy director ends 2022),
Paul Drake (D, Hillsborough Township, 2023),
Douglas Singleterry (D, North Plainfield, 2023) and 
Sara Sooy (D, Basking Ridge in Bernards Township, 2024).
Pursuant to Article VII Section II of the New Jersey State Constitution, each county in New Jersey is required to have three elected administrative officials known as constitutional officers. These officers are the County Clerk and County Surrogate (both elected for five-year terms of office) and the County Sheriff (elected for a three-year term). Constitutional officers, elected on a countywide basis are 
County Clerk Steve Peter (D, Somerville, 2022),
Sheriff Darrin Russo (D, Franklin Township, 2022) and 
Surrogate Bernice "Tina" Jalloh (D, Franklin Township, 2025)

Politics
As of March 2011, there were a total of 4,545 registered voters in Green Brook Township, of which 920 (20.2% vs. 26.0% countywide) were registered as Democrats, 1,219 (26.8% vs. 25.7%) were registered as Republicans and 2,401 (52.8% vs. 48.2%) were registered as Unaffiliated. There were 5 voters registered as Libertarians or Greens. Among the township's 2010 Census population, 63.1% (vs. 60.4% in Somerset County) were registered to vote, including 85.7% of those ages 18 and over (vs. 80.4% countywide).

In the 2012 presidential election, Republican Mitt Romney received 53.5% of the vote (1,653 cast), ahead of Democrat Barack Obama with 45.1% (1,394 votes), and other candidates with 1.4% (43 votes), among the 3,110 ballots cast by the township's 4,774 registered voters (20 ballots were spoiled), for a turnout of 65.1%. In the 2008 presidential election, Republican John McCain received 1,814 votes (53.1% vs. 46.1% countywide), ahead of Democrat Barack Obama with 1,532 votes (44.9% vs. 52.1%) and other candidates with 34 votes (1.0% vs. 1.1%), among the 3,415 ballots cast by the township's 4,470 registered voters, for a turnout of 76.4% (vs. 78.7% in Somerset County). In the 2004 presidential election, Republican George W. Bush received 1,896 votes (58.8% vs. 51.5% countywide), ahead of Democrat John Kerry with 1,290 votes (40.0% vs. 47.2%) and other candidates with 30 votes (0.9% vs. 0.9%), among the 3,225 ballots cast by the township's 3,910 registered voters, for a turnout of 82.5% (vs. 81.7% in the whole county).

In the 2013 gubernatorial election, Republican Chris Christie received 71.3% of the vote (1,341 cast), ahead of Democrat Barbara Buono with 26.8% (504 votes), and other candidates with 2.0% (37 votes), among the 1,899 ballots cast by the township's 4,810 registered voters (17 ballots were spoiled), for a turnout of 39.5%. In the 2009 gubernatorial election, Republican Chris Christie received 1,548 votes (63.9% vs. 55.8% countywide), ahead of Democrat Jon Corzine with 648 votes (26.7% vs. 34.1%), Independent Chris Daggett with 182 votes (7.5% vs. 8.7%) and other candidates with 21 votes (0.9% vs. 0.7%), among the 2,424 ballots cast by the township's 4,527 registered voters, yielding a 53.5% turnout (vs. 52.5% in the county).

Education 
The Green Brook School District serves public school students in pre-kindergarten through eighth grade. As of the 2019–20 school year, the district, comprised of two schools, had an enrollment of 770 students and 81.7 classroom teachers (on an FTE basis), for a student–teacher ratio of 9.4:1. Schools in the district (with 2019–20 enrollment data from the National Center for Education Statistics) are 
Irene E. Feldkirchner Elementary School with 374 students in grades Pre-K–4 and 
Green Brook Middle School with 393 students in grades 5–8.

Green Brook's public school students in ninth through twelfth grades attend Watchung Hills Regional High School in Warren Township. Students from Green Brook and from the neighboring communities of Watchung, Warren Township (in Somerset County), and Long Hill Township (in Morris County) attend the school. As of the 2019–20 school year, the high school had an enrollment of 1,948 students and 160.6 classroom teachers (on an FTE basis), for a student–teacher ratio of 12.1:1.

Transportation

Roads and highways

U.S. Route 22 is the most prominent highway directly serving Green Brook. County Route 527 and County Route 529 also pass through.

Public transportation
NJ Transit provides local bus service on the 822 route.

Community organizations
There are several committees and organizations within the township of Green Brook. Green Brook has a Baptist church on Greenbrook Road.  There is the Green Brook Seniors, which is held at the Senior Center.  This is a place for all township seniors to meet and participate in different events.  Green Brook also has a Lions Club, which volunteers for different causes.  The Green Brook Recreation Committee is a volunteer organization that provides programs and event for all residents.

Notable people

People who were born in, residents of, or otherwise closely associated with Green Brook Township include:

 Daphne Corboz (born 1993), professional soccer player who plays as a midfielder for Manchester City Women
 Mael Corboz (born 1994), professional soccer player who plays as a midfielder for SC Verl
 Rachel Corboz (born 1996), professional soccer player who plays as a midfielder for Stade de Reims
 Paul Crook (born 1966), lead guitarist for Meat Loaf, Anthrax and Sebastian Bach
 Mickey Gall (born 1992), professional mixed martial artist who competes in the welterweight division of the Ultimate Fighting Championship
 Gloria Gaynor (born 1949), Grammy award-winning singer best known for her song "I Will Survive"
 Sarai Gonzalez (born 2005), child actress
 Josh Pauls (born 1992), gold medal winner in sled hockey at the 2010 Winter Paralympics in Vancouver

References

External links

Green Brook Township

 
1872 establishments in New Jersey
Populated places established in 1872
Township form of New Jersey government
Townships in Somerset County, New Jersey